Maleflixxx Television is a Canadian exempt English language specialty channel. It is a premium adult entertainment television channel, with programming consisting of gay male pornography. It is also noted as the first 24-hour channel of its kind in the world. Maleflixxx Television also has plans to be distributed internationally in the future, including the United States and Europe.

Maleflixx Television is owned by Channel Zero Inc. in conjunction with Sureflix Digital Distribution (a provider of gay adult programming) who program and operate the service.

See also
 AOV Adult Movie Channel
 XXX Action Clips Channel

References

External links
  (Note: adult content)

Channel Zero (company)
Canadian pornographic television channels
LGBT-related mass media in Canada
Television channels and stations established in 2004
Digital cable television networks in Canada
Gay culture in Canada
Gay pornographic television channels
Commercial-free television networks
2004 establishments in Canada